Annie "Nina" née Homan-Mulock Kennard (1844 - 1926) was an author.
 She married Arthur Challis Kennard, an ironmaster, in 1866.

Their works include biographies of Mrs. Siddons, the Shakespearean actress Sarah Siddons, another on journalist and author Lafcadio Hearn and Rachel, concerning the French actor Elisa Rachel Felix, for John H. Ingram's Eminent Women series.

She wrote the novel Helene.

References

1844 births
1926 deaths
Irish biographers
Irish women non-fiction writers
Irish women novelists
19th-century Irish non-fiction writers
19th-century Irish novelists
19th-century Irish women writers